Speedy is a 1928 American silent comedy film starring comedian Harold Lloyd in the eponymous leading role. It was Lloyd's last silent film to be released theatrically.

The film was written by Albert DeMond (titles), John Grey (story), J.A. Howe (story), Lex Neal (story) and Howard Emmett Rogers (story) with uncredited assistance from Al Boasberg and Paul Gerard Smith (dialogue sequences). The film was directed by Ted Wilde, the last silent film to be directed by him, and was shot in both Hollywood, and on location in New York City.

The film's copyright was renewed, so it will not be in the public domain until January 1, 2024.

Plot

Everybody in New York City "is in such a hurry that they take Saturday's bath on Friday so they can do Monday's washing on Sunday".  But in one slower-paced, "old-fashioned corner of the city", Pop Dillon (Burt Woodruff) owns and operates the city's last horse-drawn streetcar.  His granddaughter Jane Dillon (Ann Christy) is in love with Harold "Speedy" Swift (Harold Lloyd).

Speedy, an avid New York Yankees fan, is working at a soda shop. As well as doing his work, he takes frequent telephone calls during Yankees games and passes the line scores on to the kitchen staff by arranging food items in a display case (such as doughnuts for zeroes).  But he loses the job after he is ordered to deliver some flowers and lets someone close a car door on them when he gets distracted by a display of baseball scores in a shop window.

Streetcar magnate W.S. Wilton (Byron Douglas) comes to Pop's home to ask for his price to sell the car line, but Speedy spots a newspaper article and realizes that this is part of a plan to form a streetcar monopoly in the city.  He surreptitiously raises Pop's written price from $10,000 to $70,000.  Wilton angrily refuses and threatens to force Pop out instead.

Speedy is unworried about being unemployed; he is very much used to losing jobs and finding new ones.  He and Jane go to Coney Island, where they greatly enjoy themselves despite various mishaps, such as Speedy ruining his suit jacket by leaning against wet paint.  On the way home along with a stray dog that decided to follow them, Speedy proposes to Jane, but she will not marry him until her grandfather's affairs are settled.

Speedy is hired as a taxi driver, but for some time a series of mishaps prevents him from actually taking a passenger, and he antagonizes a policeman.  Then, to his delight, Babe Ruth (playing himself) hails the cab to get to Yankee Stadium.  Although terrified by Speedy's driving, he offers Speedy a ticket to the game; but the taxi owner is there, sees Speedy in the seats when he should be working, and fires him.

At the stadium, Speedy happens to overhear Wilton on the telephone. Wilton has learned that if Pop fails to operate the horsecar every 24 hours he will lose his right to the line, and orders goons to be sent to disrupt the operation.  Speedy rushes home and arranges with small-business owners on the street to organize a defense.  The goons are beaten off with the help of Speedy's dog, but return and steal the horse and car.

Again helped by his dog, Speedy finds out where the car has been taken and manages to steal it back.  In a madcap chase scene, he brings it back across the city to Pop's tracks, stealing fresh horses, tricking police to avoid being stopped, and replacing a broken wheel with a manhole cover.

When Wilton sees the horsecar in place, he agrees to meet Pop's price. Speedy says that Pop is a bit deaf and won't hear him until he offers $100,000. Wilton agrees, and Speedy suggests to Jane that they plan a visit to Niagara Falls by horsecar.

Cast
 Harold Lloyd as Harold 'Speedy' Swift
 Ann Christy as Jane Dillon
 Bert Woodruff as Pop Dillon - Her Grand-daddy
 Byron Douglas as W.S. Wilton
 Brooks Benedict as Steve Carter
 Babe Ruth as himself

The finger
During the Coney Island sequence, at one point Speedy gives the finger to himself while looking in a distorted mirror.  This may be the earliest motion picture depiction of that gesture.

Lou Gehrig's brief cameo appearance
At the end of the scene where Speedy gives Babe Ruth a ride in his taxi, sharp-eyed viewers can look for an easily missed cameo appearance by Lou Gehrig, Ruth's famous New York Yankee teammate.  Gehrig walks by the far side of Speedy's cab, looks directly at the camera through the taxi's window, and sticks out his tongue.  Gehrig is on screen for about three seconds.  Ruth and Gehrig's teammate, Bob Meusel, is also seen in the film batting after Ruth hits a home run at the game Harold attends.  Meusel's at bat was not filmed for the movie but was taken from newsreel footage.

Awards and nominations
Ted Wilde, the director of the film, was nominated for the Academy Award for Best Director of a Comedy, which was used for only the 1st Academy Awards. He lost to Lewis Milestone, the director of Two Arabian Knights.

Production
Location shooting for the Coney Island scenes cost a reported $150,000. Then they reissued in December 1928 and refilmed with three dialogue sequences are taken on July 12, 1928

Preservation status
The complete silent and sound copies exist and the 16" recorded soundtrack discs for the film survive complete and are housed at the UCLA Film and Television Archive. The film's trailer also survives.

See also 
 Harold Lloyd filmography
 List of United States comedy films

References

External links 

 
 
 
 
 Progressive Silent Film List : Speedy at silentera.com
 Speedy at Virtual History
 Trailer at Archive.org
 www.film-festival.org Still as Rhode Island International Film Festival notice
 Speedy essay by Jeffrey Vance for the San Francisco Silent Film Festival
 Speedy: The Comic Figure of the Average Man an essay by Phillip Lopate at the Criterion Collection

1928 films
1928 comedy films
Silent American comedy films
American silent feature films
American black-and-white films
Films directed by Ted Wilde
Films set in Brooklyn
Films set in Coney Island
Films set in New York City
Films shot in New York City
Rail transport films
Films set in amusement parks
Films with screenplays by John Grey
Paramount Pictures films
1920s English-language films
1920s American films